The 2006–07 HockeyAllsvenskan season was the second season of the HockeyAllsvenskan, the second level of ice hockey in Sweden. 16 teams participated in the league, and the top four qualified for the Kvalserien, with the opportunity to be promoted to the Elitserien.

Participating teams

Regular season

*IFK Arboga IK did not participate in the relegation round due to their financial situation, and the team was relegated to Division 1 as a result.

Playoffs

First round
 IK Nyköping - Västerås IK 2:0 (4:3, 3:1)
 Växjö Lakers Hockey - IF Björklöven 1:2 (2:1 OT, 4:5 OT, 2:6)

Second round
 IK Nyköping - IF Björklöven 1:2 (4:5 OT, 3:1, 1:5)

Kvalserien

Relegation round

External links
 Season on hockeyarchives.info

Swe
HockeyAllsvenskan seasons
2